The Institute for Responsible Citizenship is an intensive leadership development program for talented African-American men. Its mission is to prepare men to be exemplary citizens and leaders.

History
The Institute for Responsible Citizenship was founded in 2003 by William A. Keyes, IV. Recipient of the 2010 Mac A. Stewart Distinguished Award for Service presented by Ohio State University, Keyes has previously worked in the legislative and executive branches of the U.S. Federal Government and public affairs consulting. Keyes received a degree from the School of Journalism and Mass Communication at the University of North Carolina (UNC). He has served as a senior policy advisor at the White House and a member of Board of Visitors and later part of the Board of Trustees at UNC.

Programs
The Institute was founded on five core beliefs:

 Men with the greatest potential should be challenged to pursue the highest achievement.
 Men who work hard to achieve academic success should be recognized and rewarded.
 Men who are destined for leadership should understand fundamental economic and constitutional principles.
 Men who strive to make a difference can have a greater impact by working together.
 Men of character should be encouraged to pursue success as a platform for service to their communities, our nation, and the world.

From hundreds of applications, the Institute selects some of the nation's best and brightest African American male college students to participate in an intensive two-summer program. It includes:

 High-level internships in their fields of interest
 The Lynde and Harry Bradley Seminar on Economic and Constitutional Principles
 Comprehensive leadership seminar with the Institute's founder
 Private briefings with some of the nation's most prominent public and private sector leaders
 Service as teachers and mentors in the Institute's Youth Scholar Academy.
The Institute supplements these activities with extensive support from the Institute's alumni, staff, and friends.  The Institute emphasizes the fact that scholars become a part of a genuine network that will continue to support them throughout their lives.

Each summer, the Institute also welcomes several groups of high school boys to Washington, DC to participate in the Youth Scholar Academy. YSA is a summer enrichment and college prep program that prepares high-potential young men to thrive in high school, college, and life.  Each group participates in a week-long session led by Institute scholars. The boys:
 Take classes in subjects such as a U.S. Government and Economics
 Participate in specialized sessions focused on personal growth and development
 Visit area colleges and learn about the admissions process
 Live in a residence hall at American University and eat in a campus dining hall
 Visit national landmarks and institutions
 Benefit from meaningful engagement with the Institute's scholars and alumni who provide positive images of academic success and exposure to life's possibilities.

Alumni
Since 2003, the Institute has grown to serve more than 250 scholars and alumni across the country. They have a wide variety of interests and represent small liberal arts colleges, large universities, Ivy League institutions, and historically Black college and universities.  Alumni have been accepted to all of the nation's top law schools and many of the nation's leading graduate programs.

Alumni of the program include two Rhodes Scholars, numerous Truman Scholars, and other successful professionals working in the legal, business, education, non-profit and artistic sectors.

References

Education in Washington, D.C.
African-American organizations
Internship programs
Non-profit organizations based in Washington, D.C.
2003 establishments in Washington, D.C.